Rhapsody in White is the first studio album by the American soul group, The Love Unlimited Orchestra, released in 1974. It was a huge success for the group, who backed and was led by Barry White for many singles such as "I'm Gonna Love You Just a Little More Baby". Also on the album is the 1973 "Love's Theme" single, their signature song, which reached #1 on the Billboard Hot 100.

Track listing
All songs composed written by Barry White; except where noted. 
"Barry's Theme" 
"Rhapsody in White" 
"Midnight and You" (Billy Page, Gene Page)
"I Feel Love Comin' On" (Barry White, Paul Politi) 
"Baby Blues" (Barry White, Tony Sepe)
"Don't Take It Away from Me" 
"What a Groove" 
"Love's Theme"

Charts

References

1974 debut albums
Barry White albums
20th Century Fox Records albums